Kristina J. Nicholson (born September 27, 1973) is a retired American professional basketball player. She was known for her quickness and athleticism and being relatively short. She played for the Cleveland Rockers in the 1997 WNBA season. At age 38, she was inducted into the Chester County Sports Hall of Fame.

High school
Nicholson and Tora Suber formed a backcourt duo at Downingtown High School, where she won back-to-back state titles. In total she scored 2,709 points, more any basketball player, male or female. She graduated from Downingtown High School in 1992.

College
Nicholson averaged 8.4 assists her senior year, third in the nation. She amassed 826 assists for her career at Penn State.

Personal life
Nicholson graduated with a degree in exercise and sports science.

See also
List of NCAA Division I women's basketball players with at least 800 assists

References

External links
Tina Nicholson WNBA Stats | Basketball-Reference.com
Lady Lion Basketball / Alumni Capsules

1973 births
Living people
All-American college women's basketball players
American women's basketball players
Basketball players from Pennsylvania
Cleveland Rockers players
McDonald's High School All-Americans
Penn State Lady Lions basketball players
People from Chester County, Pennsylvania